Avshalom Cyrus Elitzur (born 30 May 1957) is an Israeli physicist and philosopher.

Biography
Avshalom Elitzur was born in Kerman, Iran, to a Jewish family. When he was two years old, his family immigrated to Israel and settled in Rehovot. He left school at the age of sixteen and began working as a laboratory technician at the Weizmann Institute of Science in Rehovot. Elitzur received no formal university training before obtaining his PhD.

Elitzur was a senior lecturer at the Unit for Interdisciplinary Studies, Bar-Ilan University, Ramat-Gan, Israel. He is noted for the Elitzur–Vaidman bomb-testing problem in quantum mechanics, which was publicised by Roger Penrose in his book Shadows of the Mind.

In 1987, he published his book: Into the Holy of Holies: Psychoanalytic Insights into the Bible and Judaism.  During that same year, he was invited to present an unpublished manuscript on quantum mechanics at an international conference in Temple University in Philadelphia. Consequently, he was later invited by Yakir Aharonov of Tel Aviv University, the doyen of physicists in Israel, to write a doctoral thesis on the subject. He was the chief editor of natural sciences in Encyclopaedia Hebraica. In 2008, he was a visiting professor at Joseph Fourier University.

Elitzur is the founder of the Iyar, The Israeli Institute for Advanced Research.

Elitzur had a relationship with journalist Timura Lessinger, with whom he has a daughter.

Awards

In 2010, Elitzur won the Noetic Medal of Consciousness and Brain Research for his contributions to cosmology of mind and Quantum Theory.

Published works

Author
לפני ולפנים - עיונים פסיכואנליטיים במקרא וביהדות, תל אביב, "ירום"-אליצור, 1987
 זמן ותודעה - תהיות חדשות על חידות עתיקות, אוניברסיטה משודרת, 1994,

Editor
 'Endophysics, Time, Quantum and the Subjective', edited by Rosolino Buccheri, Avshalom C Elitzur and Metod Saniga; Germany, Bielefeld, 2005 
 'Quo Vadis Quantum Mechanics?' (The Frontiers Collection), by A. Elitzur (Editor), S. Dolev (Editor), N. Kolenda (Editor); New York: Springer, 2005 
 'Mind and its Place in the World: Phenomenology & Minds', Vol. 7 (Phenomenology & Mind) by Alexander Batthyany (Editor), Avshalom Elitzur (Editor), Ontos Verlag, 2006 
 'Irreducibly Conscious: Selected Papers on Consciousness', Herausgegeben von Batthyany, Alexander / Elitzur, Avshalom (Editors), Universitätsverlag Winter GmbH Heidelberg, 2009

References

External links
 Elitzur website

1957 births
Living people
Academic staff of Bar-Ilan University
Israeli philosophers
Israeli physicists
Israeli Mizrahi Jews
Iranian Jews
Iranian emigrants to Israel
Jewish physicists
Quantum physicists
Jewish philosophers
Phenomenologists